Lanterne (singular: lanterna) are a type of pasta.

The name derives from the Italian for oil lanterns.

Lanterne have deep ridges and are curved in a lantern shape.

See also
 List of pasta

References

Types of pasta